Jack Anthony Carlson (born August 23, 1954) is an American former professional ice hockey forward.

Career 
Carlson played in the World Hockey Association with the Minnesota Fighting Saints, Edmonton Oilers and New England Whalers, and in the National Hockey League for the Minnesota North Stars and St. Louis Blues. He accumulated 1,111 penalty minutes in 508 professional games. Late in his professional career, he came to be known as "Killer Carlson" because of "enforcer" style of play.

Carlson's brothers Steve and Jeff are also former professional hockey players, and famous for roles in the movie Slap Shot as two of the Hanson Brothers. Carlson was originally supposed to play the third brother; however, he was called up by the Edmonton Oilers just prior to shooting and was replaced by Dave Hanson.

Carlson is an acting referee and linesman for the Twin Cities AHA Hockey League.

Regular season

Playoffs

Transactions
 Selected by Detroit Red Wings, 7th Round, #117 overall, 1974 NHL Amateur Draft.
 Selected by Minnesota Fighting Saints, 9th round, #132 overall 1974 WHA Amateur Draft.
 Signed as a free agent by Edmonton (WHA) after Minnesota (WHA) franchise folded, March 10, 1976.
 Claimed by Calgary (WHA) from Edmonton in 1976 WHA Intra-League Draft, June 1976.
 Sold to Edmonton (WHA) by Minnesota (WHA) with Mike Antonovich, Bill Butters, Dave Keon, Jean-Louis Levasseur, Steve Carlson and John McKenzie for cash, January 1977.
 Traded to New England (WHA) by Edmonton (WHA) with Dave Keon, Steve Carlson, Dave Dryden and John McKenzie for future considerations (Dave Debol, June 1977), Dan Arndt and cash, January 1977.
 Rights traded to Minnesota by Detroit for future considerations, July 27, 1978.
 Traded to Minnesota by New England (WHA) for future considerations, February 1, 1979.
 Missed entire 1979–80 season recovering from back surgery.
 Claimed by St. Louis from Minnesota in Waiver Draft, October 4, 1982.
 Signed as a free agent by Minnesota, November 1986.

Hockey cards

References

External links

Jack Carlson's Hockeydraftcentral.com profile

1954 births
American men's ice hockey forwards
Detroit Red Wings draft picks
Edmonton Oilers (WHA) players
Ice hockey players from Minnesota
Johnstown Jets players
Living people
Minnesota Fighting Saints draft picks
Minnesota Fighting Saints players
Minnesota North Stars players
New England Whalers players
People from Virginia, Minnesota
St. Louis Blues players